George James Tustin (19 September 1889 – 19 May 1968) was a Progressive Conservative party, National Government and Conservative member of the House of Commons of Canada. He was born in Todmorden, Ontario and became a merchant and theatre owner by career.

Tustin was a member of the Napanee, Ontario municipal council for a decade, serving as Mayor in 1934 and 1935.

He was first elected to Parliament at the Prince Edward—Lennox riding in the 1935 general election as a candidate with Canada's original Conservative party, then re-elected in 1940 under the National Government banner. After his party's identity changed to the Progressive Conservatives, Tustin was re-elected to Parliament in 1949 and 1953.

He lost the Prince Edward—Lennox Progressive Conservative nomination to Clarence Milligan in the buildup to the 1957 federal election. Tustin was a personal friend and political ally of Progressive Conservative leader John Diefenbaker, and it was suggested at the time that his loss was a setback for Diefenbaker's leadership.

Tustin died aged 78 at Napanee, Ontario following a lengthy illness.

References

External links
 

1889 births
1968 deaths
Canadian merchants
Conservative Party of Canada (1867–1942) MPs
Mayors of places in Ontario
Members of the House of Commons of Canada from Ontario
Progressive Conservative Party of Canada MPs